Moulay Ismail University is a university in Meknes city, Morocco, which was founded in 1989. It is named after the Moroccan Sultan Moulay Ismaïl.

See also
 List of universities in Morocco

References

External links
 
 Moulay Ismail University in numbers

Moulay Ismail University
Meknes
Educational institutions established in 1989
1989 establishments in Morocco
20th-century architecture in Morocco